José Antonio Rodríguez Munera (born 1 July 1985) is a Spanish professional footballer who plays as a centre back for CP Villarrobledo.

Club career
Born in Palma de Mallorca, Rodríguez graduated from the youth academy of RCD Mallorca and made his senior debut with the reserves in 2004. On 20 October 2005, he made his first team debut in a 4–1 defeat against CD Alcoyano in the season's Copa del Rey.

After a stint with CD Ferriolense in the fourth tier, Rodríguez represented UD Ibiza-Eivissa, CD Guijuelo Polideportivo Ejido, SD Eibar, Burgos CF, UD Salamanca, Arroyo CP, CE L'Hospitalet, UD Socuéllamos and Extremadura UD – all in Segunda División B.

On 16 November 2017, Rodríguez moved abroad and joined Israeli club Maccabi Herzliya. On 2 January 2019, he switched to Greek club Karaiskakis.

Club statistics

References

External links

1985 births
Living people
Spanish footballers
Association football central defenders
Segunda División B players
Tercera División players
RCD Mallorca B players
CD Guijuelo footballers
Polideportivo Ejido footballers
SD Eibar footballers
Burgos CF footballers
UD Salamanca players
CE L'Hospitalet players
Extremadura UD footballers
Liga Leumit players
Maccabi Herzliya F.C. players
Football League (Greece) players
A.E. Karaiskakis F.C. players
Spanish expatriate footballers
Expatriate footballers in Israel
Expatriate footballers in Greece
Spanish expatriate sportspeople in Israel
Spanish expatriate sportspeople in Greece